Walter Connolly (April 8, 1887 – May 28, 1940) was an American character actor who appeared in almost 50 films between 1914 and 1939. His best known film is It Happened One Night (1934).

Early years 
Connolly attended St. Xavier College and acted in amateur theatrical productions in Cincinnati.

Career
Connolly was a successful stage actor who appeared in twenty-two Broadway productions between 1916 and 1935, notably revivals of Pirandello's Six Characters in Search of an Author and Chekhov's Uncle Vanya. His first film appearances came in two silent films, The Marked Woman (1914) and A Soldier's Oath (1915), and his first talkie film came in 1930, Many Happy Returns, but his Hollywood film career really began in 1932, when he appeared in four films.  His trademark role was that of the exasperated business tycoon or newspaperman, often as the father of the female lead character, as in It Happened One Night (1934) with Clark Gable and Claudette Colbert; Broadway Bill (1934), supporting Warner Baxter and Myrna Loy; and Libeled Lady  (1936) with William Powell and Loy again. Other notable roles included the worthless uncle of Paul Muni's character in The Good Earth (1937) and one of the two con men encountered by Mickey Rooney's Huckleberry Finn in The Adventures of Huckleberry Finn (1939). Connolly played General Yen's American advisor in The Bitter Tea of General Yen (1933).

Connolly mostly played supporting roles, but starred occasionally, as Nero Wolfe in The League of Frightened Men (1937), in RKO's 5th Ave Girl (1939), opposite Ginger Rogers, and as the title character in The Great Victor Herbert (1939), his last film.

On radio, Connolly starred as the title character in The Adventures of Charlie Chan on NBC Radio from 1932 to 1938.

Personal life 

Connolly's hobbies were collecting old books and theater programs. Connolly was married to actress Nedda Harrigan from 1921 to his death. They had one daughter, Ann (1924–2006), who was a performer in the Ziegfeld Follies of 1943 and the 1954 Broadway production of Peter Pan.

Death 
Connolly died on May 28, 1940, following a stroke, and was buried in New St. Joseph Cemetery in Cincinnati.

Complete filmography

The Marked Woman (1914) - Prince Ching
A Soldier's Oath (1915) - Raoul de Reyntiens
Many Happy Returns (1930, Short)
Washington Merry-Go-Round (1932) - Wylie
Man Against Woman (1932) - Mossie Ennis
No More Orchids (1932) - Bill Holt
The Bitter Tea of General Yen (1933) - Jones
Plainclothes Man (1932)
Paddy the Next Best Thing (1933) - Major Adair
Lady for a Day (1933) - Count Romero
Man's Castle (1933) - Ira
East of Fifth Avenue (1933) - John Lawton
Master of Men (1933) - Sam Parker
Eight Girls in a Boat (1934) - Storm
It Happened One Night (1934) - Alexander Andrews
Once to Every Woman (1934) - Dr. Selby
Twentieth Century (1934) - Webb
Whom the Gods Destroy (1934) - John Forrester aka Eric Jann aka Peter Korotoff
Servants' Entrance (1934) - Viktor Nilsson
Lady by Choice (1934) - Judge Daly
The Captain Hates the Sea (1934) - Capt. Helquist
Broadway Bill (1934) - J. L. Higgins
Father Brown, Detective (1934) - Father Brown
So Red the Rose (1935) - Malcolm Bedford
She Couldn't Take It (1935) - Daniel Van Dyke
One Way Ticket (1935) - Captain Bourne
White Lies (1935) - John Frank Mitchell
Soak the Rich (1936) - Humphrey Craig
The Music Goes 'Round (1936) - Hector Courtney
The King Steps Out (1936) - Maximilian, Duke of Bavaria
Libeled Lady (1936) - Mr. James B. Allenbury
The Good Earth (1937) - Uncle
Nancy Steele Is Missing! (1937) - Michael Steele
Let's Get Married (1937) - Joe Quinn
The League of Frightened Men (1937) - Nero Wolfe
Nothing Sacred (1937) - Oliver Stone
First Lady (1937) - Carter Hibbard
Penitentiary (1938) - Dist. Atty. Thomas Mathews
Start Cheering (1938) - Sam Lewis
Four's a Crowd (1938) - John P. Dillingwell
Too Hot to Handle (1938) - 'Gabby' MacArthur
The Girl Downstairs (1938) - Mr. Brown
The Adventures of Huckleberry Finn (1939) - The 'King'
Bridal Suite (1939) - Doctor Grauer
Good Girls Go to Paris (1939) - Olaf Brand
Coast Guard (1939) - Tobias Bliss
5th Ave Girl (1939) - Timothy Borden
Those High Grey Walls (1939) - Dr. MacAuley
The Great Victor Herbert (1939) - Victor Herbert (final film role)

Notes

External links

 
 
 
 
 
 Literature on Walter Connolly

1887 births
1940 deaths
20th-century American male actors
American male film actors
American male radio actors
American male silent film actors
American male stage actors
American people of Irish descent
Catholics from Ohio
Male actors from Cincinnati
Xavier University alumni